Breast cancer anti-estrogen resistance protein 3 is a protein that in humans is encoded by the BCAR3 gene.

Function 

Breast tumors are initially dependent on estrogens for growth and progression and can be inhibited by anti-estrogens such as tamoxifen. However, breast cancers progress to become anti-estrogen resistant. Breast cancer anti-estrogen resistance gene 3 was identified in the search for genes involved in the development of estrogen resistance. The gene encodes a component of intracellular signal transduction that causes estrogen-independent proliferation in human breast cancer cells. The protein contains a putative src homology 2 (SH2) domain, a hallmark of cellular tyrosine kinase signaling molecules, and is partly homologous to the cell division cycle protein CDC48.

References

External links

Further reading